Philippa "Flip" Jackson is a fictional character played by Lisa Greenwood in a series of audio plays produced by Big Finish Productions based on the long-running British science fiction television series Doctor Who. She is a companion of the Sixth Doctor. Her first appearance was in "The Crimes of Thomas Brewster".

Character history
The character Flip Jackson first appears in The Crimes of Thomas Brewster, where she, alongside her boyfriend, Jared Ramon, is transported from modern-day London to a sentient planet called Symbios. The characters are transported on a tube train that passes through a temporal breach. There, Flip and Jared meet the Sixth Doctor and his then-companion Evelyn Smythe, who return them to Earth.

The character returns in The Curse of Davros, where she and Jared witness the crash of a Dalek scout ship. Investigating the crash, they find the Sixth Doctor, who was forced to swap his mind with that of Davros. Although the Doctor was in Davros' body, Flip nevertheless recognizes him. During this encounter, Jared's mind is swapped with that of a Dalek. After helping the Doctor stop Davros from changing the outcome of the Battle of Waterloo and returning his and Jared's minds to their respective bodies, Flip turns down the Doctor's offer to return her to the present with Jared, and instead joins the Doctor on his travels.

Flip's time with the Doctor comes to an end in Scavenger. When orbiting the Earth in 2071, Flip becomes separate from the Doctor and almost becomes host to a piece of alien space debris named "Scavenger". After teleporting from its grasp to escape, she is trapped floating in space. Realizing she is running out of oxygen, Flip records a message for the Doctor and uses her spacesuit thrusters to propel herself towards Earth, to either await rescue or die in the attempt.

Flip's fate would be later revealed in The Widow's Assassin when the Doctor meets an older version of Peri Brown on the planet Krontep. He tells Peri of Flip's fall to Earth and explains that he had used the TARDIS to slow her descent, thus saving her. He then further reveals that he had received an invitation to her wedding to Jared, implying that he had returned her to her native time. The Doctor invites Peri to attend the wedding with him, but she declines.

Stage Fright, one of the audio stories in the audio anthology The Sixth Doctor: The Last Adventure, takes place prior to Flip's departure in Scavenger. In the story, the Doctor and Flip visit Henry Gordon Jago and Professor George Litefoot in Victorian London. They become involved with a theatrical performance that includes scenes of the Doctor's past regenerations on stage, which turns out to be a plan by the Valeyard to lure in the Doctor and attempt to rejuvenate himself with the Doctor's darkest thoughts. Flip successfully saves the Doctor and overcomes her stage fright (due to having frozen on-stage during a school play after never having learned her lines) by performing nursery rhymes on-stage.

Lisa Greenwood reprised the role as Flip in Quicksilver, where after her initial departure Flip rejoined the Sixth Doctor and his new companion Constance Clarke for further adventures after she is drawn to 1948 by a group of aliens who attempt to use her as a hostage against the Doctor.

List of appearances

Audio dramas
The Crimes of Thomas Brewster
The Curse of Davros
The Fourth Wall
Wirrn Isle
Antidote to Oblivion
The Brood of Erys
Scavenger
The Widow's Assassin
Stage Fright
Quicksilver
Vortex Ice/Cortex Fire
The Behemoth
The Middle
Static
Cry of the Vultriss
Scorched Earth
The Lovecraft Invasion

References

External links

Literary characters introduced in 2011
Doctor Who audio characters
Doctor Who spin-off companions